Paralovo may refer to:

 Paralovo (Bosilegrad), a village in Serbia
 Paralovo (Novi Pazar), a village in Serbia